Lynn Hall is a historic restaurant and related residence located In Port Allegany, Pennsylvania, United States.  It is a sprawling Modernist Movement style structure. The estate began construction in 1935 and slightly resembles the design for Fallingwater (designed by Frank Lloyd Wright). The restaurant and ballroom closed in the early 1950s.

It was listed on the National Register of Historic Places in 1984.

References

External links
Lynn Hall: Port Allegany
Lynn Hall Restoration and Tours

See also 
 National Register of Historic Places listings in McKean County, Pennsylvania

Commercial buildings on the National Register of Historic Places in Pennsylvania
Restaurants in Pennsylvania
Houses completed in 1935
Buildings and structures in McKean County, Pennsylvania
Modernist architecture in Pennsylvania
Cuisine of the Mid-Atlantic states
National Register of Historic Places in McKean County, Pennsylvania
Restaurants on the National Register of Historic Places